Angelo Pagani (born 4 August 1988 in Mariano Comense) is an Italian former cyclist, who rode professionally between 2011 and 2014, exclusively for the  team.

Major results

2005
 3rd Trofeo Emilio Paganessi
2006
 2nd Time trial, National Junior Road Championships
2007
 2nd Giro del Canavese
 3rd Memorial Davide Fardelli
2008
 3rd Giro del Canavese
 7th Memorial Davide Fardelli
2009
 2nd Overall Giro della Valle d'Aosta
 7th Giro Valli Aretine
 7th Coppa della Pace
 8th Paris–Roubaix Espoirs
2010
 2nd Giro del Belvedere
 3rd Overall Giro delle Regioni
1st Stage 2
2012
 1st Stage 1 (TTT) Giro di Padania
 1st  Young rider classification Tour of Austria
 9th Coppa Agostoni
2013
 5th Overall Tour de Slovénie
 6th Coppa Agostoni
 8th Overall Tour of Qinghai Lake

Grand Tour General Classification results timeline

WD = Withdrew; In Progress = IP

References

External links

1988 births
Living people
Italian male cyclists
Cyclists from the Province of Como